Andrei Cristian Iana (born 31 January 2002) is a Romanian professional footballer who plays as a defender for Liga III side CSM Deva. In his career, Iana also played for teams such as Cetate Deva, CSM Slatina or CSM Reșița.

References

External links
 

2002 births
Living people
Sportspeople from Râmnicu Vâlcea
Romanian footballers
Romania youth international footballers
Association football midfielders
SCM Râmnicu Vâlcea players
FC Steaua București players
CS Universitatea Craiova players
Liga I players
Liga II players
Liga III players
CSM Deva players
CSM Slatina footballers
CSM Reșița players
LPS HD Clinceni players